Kenneth John Caves (4 November 1926 – 31 July 1974) was an Australian cyclist. He competed at the 1948 and 1952 Summer Olympics.

References

External links
 

1926 births
1974 deaths
Australian male cyclists
Olympic cyclists of Australia
Cyclists at the 1948 Summer Olympics
Cyclists at the 1952 Summer Olympics
Cyclists from Brisbane
Commonwealth Games medallists in cycling
Commonwealth Games bronze medallists for Australia
Australian track cyclists
Cyclists at the 1950 British Empire Games
20th-century Australian people
Medallists at the 1950 British Empire Games